National Highway 161A, commonly as NH 161A, is a National Highway running through states of Karnataka and Maharashtra, with a total length 507 Kilometres that connects Akot, Maharashtra to  Bidar, Karnataka. National Highway 161A joins the cities of  Akot, Akola, Barshitakli, Mangrulpir, Manora, Digras, Arni, Mahur, Kinwat, Himayatnagar, Mudkhed, Waghala, Mukhed, Maharashtra–Karnataka border in central southern India with each other. It is an auxiliary route of National Highway 61.

Junctions

 At Akola with NH 6 connecting Hajira, Surat, Dhule, Akola, Amravati, Nagpur, Durg, Raipur, Mahasamund, Sambalpur, Baharagora, Kolkata
 At Akola with NH 161 connecting Akola, Washim, Hingoli, Nanded, Sangareddy, Hyderabad
 At Nanded with NH 222 connecting Kalyan, Ahmednagar, Pathardi, Parbhani, Basmat, Nanded, Nirmal
 At Nanded with NH 204 connecting Ratnagiri, Kolhapur, Sangli, Pandharpur, Solapur, Tuljapur, Latur, Nanded, Arni, Yavatmal, Wardha, Buti Bori, Nagpur

States, districts, cities, towns and villages connected
The  Maharashtra state.

1. Maharashtra State
Akot
Akola
Barshitakli
Mangrulpir
Manora
Digras
Arni
Mahur
Kinwat
Himayatnagar
Mudkhed
Waghala
Mukhed

2. Karnataka State
Aurad
Boral
Jonnekeri
Kappekeri
Santhpura
Chatnal cross
Shembelli cross
Mustapur
Kaudagaoun
Ballur
Koutha
Janwada
Markhal
Chikpet
Bidar

See also
 List of National Highways in India (by Highway Number)

References

External links 

 NH 161A on OpenStreetMap

National highways in India
161A
National Highways in Karnataka